Acacia brumalis is a shrub or tree belonging to the genus Acacia and the subgenus Phyllodineae. It is native to an area in the Wheatbelt, Great Southern and the Mid West regions of Western Australia.

It blooms from May to September and produces yellow flowers.

See also
 List of Acacia species

References

brumalis
Acacias of Western Australia
Plants described in 1995
Taxa named by Bruce Maslin